The Sunflower Woman is a 1918 Hungarian film directed by Michael Curtiz. Based on the play by Yugoslav and Croatian playwright from Dubrovnik, Ivo Vojnović, the film was shot on location in Dubrovnik.

Cast
 Ivo Badalic
 Jenő Balassa
 Lucy Doraine
 Lajos Kemenes
 Cläre Lotto
 Erzsi B. Marton
 Iván Petrovich
 Svetozar Petrov
 Lajos Réthey
 Anton Tiller
 Jenő Törzs

See also
 Michael Curtiz filmography

External links

1918 films
Hungarian black-and-white films
Hungarian silent films
Lost Hungarian films
Films directed by Michael Curtiz